The Lagarcito Formation is an Albian geologic formation in Argentina. Pterosaur fossils have been recovered from the formation. The formation overlies the La Cruz Formation and is overlain by the San Roque Formation. The sandstones and mudstones of the formation were deposited in a fluvial and mostly lacustrine environment. The fossil association and the geological evidence indicate that the Lagarcito Formation represents a perennial shallow lake situated in an alluvial plain where detrital sedimentation and semiarid climatic conditions predominated.

Fossil content 
The following fossils have been found in the Lagarcito Formation:

 Neosemionotus puntanus
 Lepidotes pusillus
 Pterodaustro guinazui
 Treptichnus pollardi
 Cyzicus aff. codoensis
 Darwinula sp.
 Copytus sp.
 Bisulcocypris sp.	
 Candonopsis sp.
 Anura indet.
 Magnoliophyta indet.
 Pleuropholidae indet.
 Trichoptera indet.

See also 
 List of pterosaur-bearing stratigraphic units

References

Bibliography

Further reading 
 A. López-Arbarello and L. Codorniú. 2007. Semionotids (Neopterygii, Semionotiformes) from the Lower Cretaceous Lagarcito Formation, San Luis Province, Argentina. Journal of Vertebrate Paleontology 27(4):811-826

Geologic formations of Argentina
Cretaceous Argentina
Albian Stage
Sandstone formations
Mudstone formations
Fluvial deposits
Lacustrine deposits
Ichnofossiliferous formations
Fossiliferous stratigraphic units of South America
Paleontology in Argentina
Geology of San Luis Province